Fairman Rogers (November 15, 1833 – August 22, 1900) was an American civil engineer, educator, and philanthropist.

Early life
Fairman Rogers was born in Philadelphia on November 15, 1833. He graduated from the University of Pennsylvania in 1853, and taught civil engineering there from 1855 to 1871. He was one of four professors who founded its Department of Mines, Arts and Manufacturers (1855), and he served as a University Trustee (1871–86). As an undergraduate, he was a founding member of its Zeta Psi fraternity, Sigma chapter (1850).

Career
At age 24, Rogers was elected to the American Philosophical Society, was a member of the Academy of Natural Sciences, and a charter member of the National Academy of Sciences. He was the author of Terrestrial Magnetism and the Magnetism of Iron Ships (1877, revised 1883).

He served in the Union Cavalry during the American Civil War, and on the engineering staffs of General John F. Reynolds and General William F. Smith. As a volunteer officer in the United States Army Corps of Engineers, he completed an 1862 survey mapping the Potomac River. As a member of the Pennsylvania militia, he fought at Antietam and Gettysburg.

He was one of the founders of the Union League of Philadelphia. He was a member of the First Troop Philadelphia City Cavalry and, following the war, was elected its captain.

Furness and Eakins
As chairman of the Building Committee for the Pennsylvania Academy of the Fine Arts, he ran the 1871 design competition for the museum-and-art-school's new building, which was won by the novice firm of Furness & Hewitt. Rogers's sister, Helen Kate, was married to the Shakespearean scholar Horace Howard Furness, brother of the PAFA-commission-winning architect Frank Furness.

He served as chairman of PAFA's Committee on Instruction (1878–83), and changed the Academy's policy to admitting women under the same conditions and offering them the same opportunities as men.

He recruited the controversial artist Thomas Eakins back to teach at the school, and commissioned an important painting from him: The Fairman Rogers Four-in-Hand (1879–80). It shows Rogers, his wife Rebecca Gilpin Rogers, and friends driving through Philadelphia's Fairmount Park. In 1882, he promoted Eakins to director of PAFA's art school.

Rogers's favorite mare, "Josephine," the lead horse in The Fairman Rogers Four-in-Hand, died in 1882. He donated the carcass to PAFA, where Eakins and his students studied and dissected it. Based on this process, Eakins modeled three écorché statuettes to serve as teaching tools for equine musculature.

In 1883, Rogers invited the animal-locomotion photographer Eadweard Muybridge to lecture at PAFA. This led to Muybridge's moving from California to Philadelphia, and continuing his research at the University of Pennsylvania's Veterinary School.

He was an avid coaching enthusiast, and founder of the Philadelphia Coaching Club. He wrote what is still the definitive guide to the sport: A Manual of Coaching (Philadelphia: 1900).

Horace Howard Furness wrote a biographical memoir of his brother-in-law: F. R. [Fairman Rogers] 1833-1900 (Philadelphia: privately printed, 1903). A March 2007 exhibition at the University of Pennsylvania, Equus Unbound: Fairman Rogers and the Age of the Horse, highlighted materials from his papers.

Personal life
Rogers hired Furness to alter his Rittenhouse Square city house (1871), and to design "Fairholme" (1874–75, now altered), his summer cottage in Newport, Rhode Island. He also had a country house in Wallingford, Pennsylvania. Rogers later sold his city house, and Furness altered it for Alexander J. Cassatt (1888).

He and his wife had no children. They moved to Paris about 1890. Rogers died in Vienna in August 1900. He is buried in Philadelphia's Laurel Hill Cemetery.

Gallery

References

External links
Fairman Rogers, A Manual of Coaching (1900) from Google books.
Fairman Rogers Papers, at the University of Pennsylvania Archives
Eadweard Muybridge and the University of Pennsylvania
 

Engineers from Pennsylvania
Educators from Philadelphia
University of Pennsylvania alumni
University of Pennsylvania faculty
1833 births
1900 deaths
Furness family
Writers from Newport, Rhode Island
People from Delaware County, Pennsylvania
Union Army officers
People of Pennsylvania in the American Civil War
Writers from Philadelphia
Members of the United States National Academy of Sciences
Members of the American Philosophical Society
Burials at Laurel Hill Cemetery (Philadelphia)
People associated with the Pennsylvania Academy of the Fine Arts